Nicolás Massú was the defending champion but decided not to participate.
Pere Riba won the tournament after defeating Carlos Berlocq 6–4, 6–0 in the final.

Seeds

Draw

Finals

Top half

Bottom half

References
 Main Draw
 Qualifying Draw

Abierto Internacional Varonil Casablanca Cancun - Singles
Abierto Internacional Varonil Casablanca Cancún